The Gainesville Police Department is responsible for law enforcement within the city limits of Gainesville, Florida. This includes operations, investigations, crime prevention, victim outreach, community outreach, and youth outreach.

History
The police department formed in the early 1900s. The department began purchasing cars in 1908. By 1922, the department consisted of three members, and over time the department kept growing.

See also
List of United States state and local law enforcement agencies

References

External links
Gainesville Police Department website

Gainesville, Florida
Municipal police departments of Florida